Arbnor Fejzullahu (born 8 April 1993) is an Albanian professional footballer who plays as a right-back for Swiss club Rapperswil-Jona.

Club career

Early career
Fejzullahu was born in the town Vranje in southern Serbia, FR Yugoslavia to Albanian parents. He played for the local ethnic Albanian team Tërnoci from the town of Veliki Trnovac. He was an important first team member in the heart of the midfield at the age of just 17 in the Serbian 5th tier of the football level.

Besa Kavajë
Fejzullahu moved to Albania in the summer of 2011 to join Besa Kavajë who had just been relegated to the Albanian First Division. Following his arrival prompted positive feedback by both the manager of Besa, Gugash Magani and the club's directors who all believed Fejzullahu would play a big role in the club's ambitions to return to the Albanian Superliga.

Partizani Tirana
Following Besa's relegation to the Albanian First Division, Fejzullahu was given permission by the club to leave, and after interest from several Albanian sides he decided to join Partizani Tirana. He officially signed on 27 May alongside Idriz Batha and the new manager Shpëtim Duro. Fejzullahu debuted in team's opening match of 2014–15 season against Laçi, starting and playing full-90 minutes in a 1–1 away draw. Later, on 19 November 2014, he scored his first goal for the club against Lushnja, valid for the second round of Albanian Cup, scoring the equaliser in the 25th minute, in an eventual 4–1 home win.

Following the end of 2015–16, Fejzullahu handed a transfer request in order to move abroad. He was willing to pay the clausole which was €50,000. Aside moving abroad, he was strongly linked with a move to Skënderbeu Korçë, participating in a training session with them. Partizani did not allow the player to leave the club due his contract until June 2017, which led the played to send the case to the Room of Conflict Resolution, where the club was victorious. In the end, the player decided to stay at Partizani for the new season.

On 30 September 2016, Fejzullahu agreed a contract extension, signing a contract until June 2018.

International career
Interest was shown in Fejzullahu by the Serbia U-18 side in January 2011, but he declined the request to represent Serbia, stating that he would like to play for Albania.

In August 2011 he was invited by the Albanian Football Association to participate in a training camp held in Kamëz, Albania following the recommendation by a member of the Albanian supporters' association Tifozat Kuq e Zi, Jetmir Salihu.
 The training camp was held for ethnic Albanian footballers playing abroad. He shone amongst the 30 participants which meant the Albanian Football Association quickly began the procedure to equip the player with Albanian citizsenhip.

Albania senior team
Fejzullahu received his first call up to the senior Albania national team by Gianni De Biasi on 8 June 2015 for a friendly game against France on 13 June and was used in the last minutes of the match, marking thus his debut.

Career statistics

Club

International

References

External links
 
 
 
 Arbnor Fejzullahu profile FSHF.org

1993 births
Living people
People from Vranje
Albanians in Serbia
Association football defenders
Association football midfielders
Serbian footballers
Albanian footballers
Albania youth international footballers
Albania under-21 international footballers
Albania international footballers
Besa Kavajë players
FK Partizani Tirana players
Kategoria e Parë players
Kategoria Superiore players
Albanian expatriate footballers
Expatriate footballers in Switzerland
Albanian expatriate sportspeople in Switzerland